Wimbledon is an ecclesiastical parish and part of the Rural Deanery of Merton and Southwark Diocese in Wimbledon, London, UK. There are five churches, four of which are part of the Wimbledon Team Ministry.

Churches

 St Mary's, St. Mary's Road.
 St Mark's, St Mark's Place.
 St Matthew's, Durham Road.
 St John's, Spencer Hill
 Emmanuel, 24 Ridgway.

Wimbledon Team Ministry

There are four churches which are part of the team:

 St Mary's
 St Mark's
 St John's
 St Matthew's

See also

 St Mary's Church, Wimbledon

References

External links
Parish of Wimbledon website
History of the Parish of Wimbledon

Religion in the London Borough of Merton